Maite Zugarrondo Etxeberria (born 4 May 1989) is a Spanish former handballer.

She played for Super Amara Bera Bera and the Spanish national team. At the beginning of the 2017/2018 season she developed pericarditis. Zugarrondo retired in 2019 to raise her two nieces.

Achievements

Spanish League:
 Winner: 2008/09, 2009/10, 2010/11, 2014/15, 2015/16, 2017/18
 Copa de la Reina de Balonmano:
 Winner: 2010, 2011, 2012, 2016
 Runner-up: 2015, 2017, 2018

References 

Living people
1989 births
Spanish female handball players
Sportspeople from Pamplona
Handball players from Navarre